United Nations Security Council Resolution 2031 was unanimously adopted on 21 December 2011 after recalling resolution 1913 (2010). The Security Council, concerned over the security vacuum in many parts of the Central African Republic and of reports of continued human rights violations there, extended the mandate of the United Nations Peacebuilding Office in that country (BINUCA) until 31 January 2013.

See also 
List of United Nations Security Council Resolutions 2001 to 2100

References

External links
Text of the Resolution at undocs.org

 2031
2011 in the Central African Republic
United Nations Security Council resolutions concerning the Central African Republic
December 2011 events